They (stylised THEY.) is an American R&B duo from Los Angeles, California, consisting of Dante Jones and Andrew "Drew Love" Neely. The duo started their career in 2015, releasing the debut extended play, Nü Religion, which received critical acclaim. That year, they released the commercially successful single "Working for It" in collaboration with Zhu and Skrillex. In 2016, they began touring with singer Bryson Tiller. The following year, the duo released their debut studio album, Nü Religion: Hyena. In 2020, They signed to Avant Garden Records under Island Records and released their second studio album, The Amanda Tape, on October 23, 2020.

Career

2015: Formation and Nü Religion
Dante Jones was born in Denver, Colorado, while Andrew Neely was born in Washington, D.C. The duo was formed in Los Angeles, California in 2015. On October 13, 2015, the duo released their debut extended play, Nü Religion, through Mind of a Genius Records and Warner Bros. Records. The project, which includes three songs in its track listing, received favorable reviews from music critics. Additionally, the duo began gaining support from record producer Timbaland. While talking about the project in an interview with The Fader magazine, Drew said; "Nü Religion is a new way of thinking. As individuals the way we have approached life and the art of music has always been left of center; even from youth. It's been all about finding a way to incorporate that into a cohesive musical project that we are proud of and that people enjoy. We think we've done that." On October 22, 2015, "Working for It", a collaboration single by They, Zhu and Skrillex, was released. The song peaked at number 30 in Australia and number 71 in the United Kingdom. The song appeared in Zhu's EP, Genesis Series and debut studio album, Generationwhy.

2016–2018: Nü Religion: Hyena
In early 2016, the duo joined singer Bryson Tiller as opening act for his Trapsoul Tour. In summer 2016, the duo released the singles, "Say When" and "Deep End", both of which managed to enter the Billboard Twitter Emerging Artists chart. On August 8, 2016, THEY. was named "New band of the week" by The Guardian newspaper. In October 2016, the duo was included in Complex magazine's "Best New Musicians in 2016 Across America" list. On February 24, 2017, the duo released their debut studio album, Nü Religion: Hyena. Following the release of their album, They solidified their breakthrough year by performing at the Coachella Valley Music and Arts Festival.

2018–2019: Fireside EP 
In 2018, the duo also joined Grammy-nominated artist 6LACK as an opening act for his From East Atlanta with Love tour. They also released their collaborative EP Fireside in 2018, which features Wiz Khalifa, Jessie Reyez, Jeremih, Vic Mensa, Ty Dolla Sign, and Gallant. This project was influenced by 90s R&B, soul music, trap music, and a recent genre of hip hop known as emo rap, in which the instrumental is guitar-driven.

2020–present: The Amanda Tape 
They signed to Avant Garden Records and in June 2020, the duo returned for the release of their new single "Count Me In" from their forthcoming album, The Amanda Tape, marking their first official release of 2020. They and Tinashe linked up in July for the throwback R&B jam "Play Fight" as the second single from The Amanda Tape.

Influences
The duo is influenced by artists like Taking Back Sunday, New Edition, Babyface and Kurt Cobain.

Their 2018 EP Fireside, which features Wiz Khalifa, Jessie Reyez, Jeremih, Vic Mensa, Ty Dolla Sign, and Gallant has been influenced by 90s R&B, soul music, trap music, and a recent genre of hip hop known as emo rap, in which the instrumental is guitar-driven.

Discography

Studio albums

Extended plays

Singles

Guest appearances

References

External links

 
 

African-American musical groups
American hip hop groups
American contemporary R&B musical groups
American musical duos
Hip hop duos
Contemporary R&B duos
Musical groups from Los Angeles